"Tell Me My Lying Eyes Are Wrong" is a song by George Jones.  A "cheatin' song" written by Dallas Frazier and Sanger D. Shafer, it was released by Jones as a single on Musicor Records and peaked at No. 13 on the Billboard country music chart in 1970. Jones was becoming disenchanted with the production of his records, which were being issued at a furious pace.  As Bob Allen points out in his book George Jones: The Life and Times of a Honky Tonk Legend, "During his time with Musicor, "George recorded more than over 280 songs - most of which were done in rushed, sloppily produced sessions - and help to establish for himself a somewhat unwelcome reputation as one of country music's most overrecorded artists."

Chart performance

References

1970 singles
George Jones songs
Musicor Records singles
Songs written by Dallas Frazier
Songs written by Sanger D. Shafer
Song recordings produced by Pappy Daily
1970 songs